Lomographa semiclarata, known generally as the bluish spring moth or wild cherry looper, is a species of geometrid moth in the family Geometridae. It is found in North America.

The MONA or Hodges number for Lomographa semiclarata is 6666.

References

Further reading

External links

 

Lomographa
Articles created by Qbugbot
Moths described in 1866